Ryu Choon-soo is a prominent South Korean architect, educator, and artist. He worked under Kim Swoo-Geun who was a pioneer of Korean modern architecture. He designed many projects both in South Korea and abroad, including the Seoul World Cup Stadium and the 868 Towers Apartments in Haikou. Currently, he is the CEO at Beyond Space architect associates.

Biography 
Ryu Choon-su was born on November 18, 1946, in Bonghwa in North Gyeongsang province, South Korea. He graduated from Daegu High School in 1964 and majored in architecture in Hanyang University in 1970. After he graduated, he worked at General Architect Associates and Chonghap Architect Associates until 1974, and worked as the director of Space Group of Korea, which was established by Kim Swoo-geun. While working and learning under Kim Swoo-Geun, he also worked as a lecturer in the Architecture department of Hanyang University. Until 1986, he studied landscape architecture for a master's degree at the graduate school of environmental studies at Seoul National University. In 1986, he was one of the members who established Beyond Space Group, for which currently he is CEO. In 1990, he was appointed a board member of the Korean Institute of Architects, and in 1994, he was appointed as a National plan-check Committee Member in the Ministry of Construction of South Korea. In 2005, he became an expert advisor to the Cultural Properties Committee, and from 2008 to 2010, he served as member of the Presidential Commission on Architecture Policy under the regime of President Lee Myung-bak, the 10th president of South Korea.

Philosophy and style 
Choon-Soo Ryu is known as world class architect with oriental sensitivity and western rationality. His working style is somewhat unusual. Young architects concentrate in analytical criteria, whereas he approaches in intuitive and integrated way of design. His design approach of integrating rational thinking and formative solution is often referred as oriental approach. He does every work from initial sketch to final design. As a result, his architectural insights and scopes are very wide, that his projects include small residential buildings, subway station, major sports facilities, and skyscrapers. In his works, both orientalism and modernism coexists. The only reason, that both tradition and high-tech exist in his works, is mutual function of two factors through integration. His balance of oriental sensitivity and western rationality is well shown in 868 Towers in China and Seoul World Cup Stadium.

Oriental sensitivity 
Choon-Soo Ryu is often evaluated as the most very Korean architect. There are several reasons of this evaluation, that he is devout Buddhist, and he uses indigenous materials, space organization and beauty of form. but the most important reason is his indigenous sensitivity which is originated from his childhood background which he spent in countryside. Moreover, the fact that his teacher, Kim Swoo-Geun, pursued the Korean tradition, inspired him a lot in his oriental sensitivity. Unlike most of his peer architects who were locked in only western architectural beauty and modernism, and neglected Korean traditional style, he integrated traditional and modern beauty.

Western rationality 
Not only he emphasized oriental and Korean beauty but also he aimed modern and western rationality backed by his belief of modern technologies. To him, artisan spirit of architects means spatial and formative problem solving skills and technical problem solving skills. His works are based on solution of rationality which is required for architectural functions and techniques.

Major works

Han-Gae-Ryung service area building, 1982 
This service area is located within one of the most famous national parks in South Korea, Seoraksan National Park. This work shows more active approach of integration of tradition and modern through use of wooden material and traditional architectural factors. This work was awarded Korean Institute of Architects award of BEST-7 in 1983.

Olympic Gymnastic Stadium, 1986 
Olympic Gymnastic Stadium was built for gymnastic games of 1988 Seoul Olympics. Choon-Soo Ryu used cable tension structure for the roof structure of the stadium for the very first time in the world with Dr. Owen Geiger who was the expert of membrane structure. After they applied cable tension structure technique in this project, a lot of projects around the world started to implement this technique.

868 Towers, 1992 
868 Towers is located in Hainan, China. This structure consists of two towers which have different height and functions. He tried to express the harmony of negative and positive which is oriental idea. A tower with 86 stories is for hotel and office, and expresses lightness and simplicity. Another one with 68 stories is residential tower, and expresses roughness and movement. Additionally, two towers are connected with the bridge. 868 Towers is significant because Choon-Soo Ryu intended to offer oriental paradigm, alternative to western concept of skyscrapers.

Seoul World Cup Stadium, 1997 
Seoul World Cup Stadium is the great example of Choon-Soo Ryu's work which realizes Korean beauty, modernism and rationality. Some formative concepts which were reflected in this stadium were octagonal base which represents richness and roof's membrane structure which was abstracted by Korean traditional Bangpae Kite. the stadium expresses regionality and symbolism as main stadium during 2002 World Cup and gives structural efficiency and functional rationality which is required for major sports stadium.

Other works 
 Wonju Chi-Ak gym, Wonju, South Korea, 1979
 Busan Sajik baseball stadium, Busan, South Korea, 1980
 Sarawak Stadium, Kuching, Malaysia, 1986
 Sam-Ha-Ri residential houses, 1986
 Ritz-Carlton Hotel, Seoul, South Korea, 1989
 National Busan traditional music hall, Busan, South Korea, 2003
 Departement of art and culture building of Kunkook University, Seoul, South Korea, 2004
 Hainan 2020 Town, Hainan, China, 2006
 Tongyeong maritime sports center, Tongyeong, South Korea, 2009

Awards 
 Gold Medal "Quaternario 88" International Award / 88 Seoul Olympic Gymnastics Stadium, 1988
 '95 Korean Architecture Awards / The Ritz-Carlton Hotel Seoul, 1995
 The Duke Edinburgh Fellowship award, 2000
 Seoul architect a gold prize / Seoul World Cup Stadium, 2000
 IOC/IAKS award, 2007
 AIA Honorary Fellowship, 2008
 Okgwan Order of Culture Merit, 2011

Bibliography 
 The Difference of Landscape Interpretation Between East and West / No.185 Space magazine, 1982
 A Study on The Master Plan for '88 Seoul Olympic Memorial Park and Doonchon, 1985
 How a Frog Understands the Ocean / Architectural Column, 1999
 PA-Architect/Ryu Choon-Soo / Archiworld&PA

References 

1946 births
Living people
South Korean architects
Sports venue architects